The buff-breasted wheatear (Oenanthe bottae) is a species of bird in the Old World flycatcher family Muscicapidae that is found in the montane areas of the southwestern Arabian Peninsula. It is also known as Botta's wheatear or the red-breasted wheatear.

Heuglin's wheatear (O. heuglini) and the rusty-breasted wheatear (Oenanthe frenata) were formerly considered to be conspecific.

Description
Resembles the larger and darker northern wheatear, but with a duller reddish breast and broader black tail tip. The sexes are alike.

Range and habitat
It is found in south-west Saudi Arabia . Its natural habitat is subtropical or tropical high-altitude grassland. It is most common at altitudes over 1800 m.

References

buff-breasted wheatear
Birds of the Middle East
red-breasted wheatear
red-breasted wheatear
Taxonomy articles created by Polbot